Länk FC Vilaverdense  is a Portuguese football club based in Vila Verde in the district of Braga. The team plays in Portugal's top-division league, Campeonato Nacional de Futebol Feminino.

It's part of the Portuguese club Vilaverdense F.C., which also operates a men's team.

Current squad

References

Women's football clubs in Portugal
Campeonato Nacional de Futebol Feminino teams